HMS Loch More was a  of the Royal Navy named after Loch More in Scotland.

References

Publications
 

 

More (K639)
Loch More (K639)
1944 ships